Lubyanka, rural localities in Belarus and Russia, may refer to:

 Belarus
 Lubyanka, Gomel Oblast, a village
 Lubyanka, Smarhon' District, Grodno Oblast, a village
 Lubyanka, Svislach District, Grodno Oblast, a village
 Lubyanka, Bykhaw District, Mogilev Oblast, a village
 Lubyanka, Klimavichy District, Mogilev Oblast, a village

 Russia
 Lubyanka, Kaloega Oblast, a selo
 Lubyanka, Kursk Oblast, a village
 Lubyanka, Orjol Oblast, a selo
 Lubyanka, Perm Krai, a village
 Lubyanka, Primorsky Krai, a selo
 Lubyanka, Mikhaylovsky District, Ryazan Oblast, a village
 Lubyanka, Miloslavsky District, Ryazan Oblast, a village
 Lubyanka, Sverdlovsk Oblast, a settlement
 Lubyanka, Tula Oblast, a village

 Also
Lubyanka Square, Moscow
Bolshaya Lubyanka Street, Moscow
Lubyanka Building, former KGB headquarters and prison at Lubyanka Square, Moscow
Lubyanka (Metro), a metro station in Moscow

 See also
 Lubianka (disambiguation)
 Łubianka (disambiguation)